Alıncalı (also, Alyndzhaly) is a village in the Samukh Rayon of Azerbaijan.

There are 8 airports near Alıncalı, of which two are larger airports. The closest airport in Azerbaijan is Ganja Airport in a distance of 4 mi (or 6 km), South-West.

There are several Unesco world heritage sites nearby. The closest heritage site is Monasteries of Haghpat and Sanahin in Armenia at a distance of 90 mi (or 145 km).

References 

Populated places in Samukh District